Vicky Batta is a 40-year-old Indian weightlifter. He won the silver medal in the men's 56 kg class at the 2006 Commonwealth Games.

He failed a drug test in 2007. He subsequently failed another drug test in 2009 and received a life ban.

References

Indian male weightlifters
Year of birth missing (living people)
Living people
Commonwealth Games silver medallists for India
Weightlifters at the 2006 Commonwealth Games
Doping cases in weightlifting
Commonwealth Games medallists in weightlifting
Place of birth missing (living people)
20th-century Indian people
21st-century Indian people
Medallists at the 2006 Commonwealth Games